This article is about the demographic features of the population of the Cook Islands, including population density, ethnicity, education level, health of the populace, economic status, religious affiliations and other aspects of the population.

A census is carried out every five years in the Cook Islands. The last census was carried out in 2016 and the next census will be carried out in December 2021.

Vital statistics

Births and deaths

Religion 

The Cook Islands are majority-Protestant, with almost half the population being members of the Reformed Cook Islands Christian Church. Other Protestant denominations include Seventh-day Adventists, Assemblies of God and the Apostolic Church (the latter two being Pentecostal denominations). The largest non-Protestant denomination are Roman Catholics, followed by the Church of Jesus Christ of Latter-day Saints. Non-Christian faiths including Hinduism, Buddhism and Islam have small followings primarily by non-indigenous inhabitants.

Ethnic groups 

The indigenous Polynesian people of the Cook islands are known as Cook Islands Māori. These include speakers of Cook Islands Māori language, closely related to Tahitian and New Zealand Māori, who form the majority of the population and inhabit the southern islands including Rarotonga;  and also the people of Pukapuka, who speak a language more closely relate to Samoan. Cook Islanders of non-indigenous descent include other Pacific Island peoples, Papa'a (Europeans), and those of Asian descent.

CIA World Factbook demographic statistics 

The following demographic statistics are from the CIA World Factbook, unless otherwise indicated.

 Population
8,128
 Age structure (2022 est.)
0–14 years: 18.69% (male 797/female 722)
15–24 years: 13.9% (male 606/female 524)
25–54 years: 37.66% (male 1,595/female 1,634)
55–64 years: 15.69% (male 711/female 564)
65 years and over: 14.74% (male 584/female 614) 
 Population growth rate
 -2.39%
 Birth rate
 12.55 births/1,000 population
 Death rate
 9.1 deaths/1,000 population
 Infant mortality rate
Total: 15.93 deaths/1,000 live births
Male: 20.02 deaths/1,000 live births
Female: 11.62 deaths/1,000 live births 
 Life expectancy at birth
Total population: 77.14 years
Male: 74.32 years
Female: 80.11 years (2022 est.)
 Total fertility rate
2.07 children born/woman 
 Nationality
 Cook Islander(s) (Noun)
 Cook Islander (Adjective)
 Ethnic groups
Cook Island Maori (Polynesian) 81.3%
part Cook Island Maori 6.7%
Other 11.9% 
 Religions
Protestant 62.8% 
Cook Islands Christian Church 49.1%
Seventh-day Adventist 7.9%,
Assemblies of God 3.7%
Apostolic Church 2.1%),
Roman Catholic 17%
Mormon 4.4%, 
Other 8%
This "Other" group includes smaller Christian denominations, and mostly non-indigenous adherents of Hinduism, Buddhism, and Islam, as well as the irreligious.
None 5.6%
No response 2.2%
Languages
English (official) 86.4%
Cook Islands Maori (Rarotongan) (official) 76.2%
Other 8.3%

References

 
Geography of the Cook Islands